Manuel Castro Ruiz (November 9, 1918 – November 18, 2008) was a Mexican Bishop of the Roman Catholic Church.

He was born in Morelia, Michoacán, where he was ordained a priest on June 19, 1943. He was appointed Auxiliary Bishop of the Archdiocese of Yucatán on July 21, 1965, along with Titular Bishop of Cincari and was ordained a bishop on December 27, 1965. Mons. Manuel Castro Ruiz, he was a Council Father, attended the Second Vatican Council on 11 October 1962 to 8 December 1965. In 1993, he was the host of Pope John Paul II, who visited Yucatán. Being the first state visit, to restore the diplomatic relations of Mexico and the Vatican.

Castro Ruiz was appointed as Archbishop of the Archdiocese of Yucatán on September 20, 1969, and retired from there on March 15, 1995.

External links and additional sources
 (for Chronology of Bishops)
 (for Chronology of Bishops)
Catholic-Hierarchy
Yucatán Diocese 

1918 births
2008 deaths
20th-century Roman Catholic archbishops in Mexico
Participants in the Second Vatican Council
People from Morelia